Events from the year 1364 in Ireland.

Incumbent
 Lord: Edward III

Events
 Robert de Ashton`appointed Lord Chancellor of Ireland

Births

Deaths

References

 
1360s in Ireland
Ireland
Years of the 14th century in Ireland